Tower Hill to Cockham Wood is a  biological and geological Site of Special Scientific Interest on the northern outskirts of Rochester in Kent. It contains two Geological Conservation Review sites.

This site contains typical woodland on Tertiary deposits, and sandy areas which have diverse invertebrates, including seven nationally rare bees and wasps. Upnor Quarry exposes a complete sequence of Tertiary rocks.

There are public footpaths through the site, but some parts are private land.

References

Sites of Special Scientific Interest in Kent
Geological Conservation Review sites
Forests and woodlands of Kent